Tembo may refer to:
Motembo
Kitembo
Tembo dialect of Nyamwanga